A bobbin boy was a boy who worked in a textile mill in the 18th and early 19th centuries. One example of rising from this job to great heights in America was young Andrew Carnegie, who at age 13 worked as a bobbin boy in 1848.

Description

In the 18th and early 19th centuries, bobbin boys worked in textile mills. The boys brought bobbins to the women at the looms when they called for them, and collected the full bobbins of spun cotton or wool thread. They also would be expected to fix minor problems with the machines. Average pay was about $1.00 a week (compared to 1900), with days often beginning at 5:30 am and ending around 7:30 pm six days a week. The job as a bobbin boy was extremely dangerous, and there was always an extreme risk of death.

Notable bobbin boys
One example of rising from this job to great heights in America was young Andrew Carnegie, who at age 13 worked as a bobbin boy in 1848.
The following persons once worked as a bobbin boy:
 Andrew Carnegie, the great steel tycoon
 Nathaniel Prentice Banks, Governor of Massachusetts and Union general
 Robert Frost, poet

See also
 Doffer

Notes

Industrial occupations
Child labor in the United States
Obsolete occupations
Textile industry